Santa Vittoria in Matenano is a comune (municipality) in the Province of Fermo in the central Italian region Marche, located about  south of Ancona and about  northwest of Ascoli Piceno.

Its name refers to Saint Victoria, some of whose relics were transferred in 827 by Abbot Peter of Farfa from the Abbey to Mount Matenano in the Picene area (roughly the south of Le Marche) due to Saracen invasions.  Ratfredus, a later Abbot of Farfa, brought the body of Santa Vittoria from Farfa on 20 June 931.

The 1966 published novel by Robert Crichton took place here. Stanley Kramer's The Secret of Santa Vittoria (1969) was shot in Anticoli Corrado, because the town had become too modernized since the Second World War period in which the story was set.

International relations

Twin towns — Sister cities
Santa Vittoria in Matenano is twinned with:

Photos
 www.flickr.com/photos/21899366@N07/sets/72157622532347787/

References

Cities and towns in the Marche